Vincent Rousseau (born 29 July 1962 in Mons, Hainaut) is a former long-distance runner from Belgium, who competed in three consecutive Summer Olympics for his native country, starting in 1984. In 1993, he had his biggest success by winning the IAAF World Half Marathon Championships in Brussels, the next year followed by the first place in the Rotterdam Marathon. Twice (1985 and 1993) Rousseau was named Belgian Sportsman of the Year.

He had much success at the Lotto Cross Cup (Belgium's annual cross country running series) and was the overall season winner five times consecutively between 1983–88 and he earned a further three consecutive wins between 1990 and 1993.

Among his other wins on the circuit were the Dam tot Damloop in 1987, Eurocross in 1990, and the 20 km of Brussels in 1995.

Achievements

References

External links 
 

1962 births
Living people
Belgian male long-distance runners
Belgian male marathon runners
Olympic athletes of Belgium
Athletes (track and field) at the 1984 Summer Olympics
Athletes (track and field) at the 1988 Summer Olympics
Athletes (track and field) at the 1992 Summer Olympics
World Athletics Championships athletes for Belgium
European Athletics Championships medalists
World Athletics Half Marathon Championships winners
Recipients of the Association of International Marathons and Distance Races Best Marathon Runner Award
Sportspeople from Mons